Bouchercon is an annual convention of creators and devotees of mystery and detective fiction. It is named in honour of writer, reviewer, and editor Anthony Boucher; also the inspiration for the Anthony Awards, which have been issued at the convention since 1986. This page details Bouchercon XLI and the 25th Anthony Awards ceremony.

Bouchercon
The convention was held in the Hyatt Regency San Francisco of San Francisco, California, on October 14, 2010; running until the 17th. The event was chaired by crime fiction reviewer Rae Helmsworth.

Special Guests
Distinguished Contribution to the Genre — Lee Child
International Guest of Honor — Denise Mina
American Guest of Honor — Laurie R. King
Toastmaster — Eddie Muller
Fan Guest of Honor — Maddy Van Hertbruggen

Anthony Awards
The following list details the awards distributed at the twenty-fifth annual Anthony Awards ceremony.

Novel award
Winner:
Louise Penny, The Brutal Telling

Shortlist:
John Hart, The Last Child
Charlie Huston, The Mystic Arts of Erasing All Signs of Death
Stieg Larsson, The Girl Who Played with Fire
S. J. Rozan, The Shanghai Moon

First novel award
Winner:
Sophie Littlefield, A Bad Day for Sorry

Shortlist:
Alan Bradley, The Sweetness at the Bottom of the Pie
Bryan Gruley, Starvation Lake
Stuart Neville, The Twelve
Stefanie Pintoff, In the Shadow of Gotham

Paperback original award
Winner:
Bryan Gruley, Starvation Lake

Shortlist:
Megan Abbott, Bury Me Deep
Ken Bruen & Reed Farrel Coleman, Tower
Max Allan Collins, Quarry in the Middle
G. M. Malliet, Death and the Lit Chick
Hank Phillippi Ryan, Air Time

Short story award
Winner:
Hank Phillippi Ryan, "On the House", from Quarry: Crime Stories by New England Writers

Shortlist:
Ace Atkins, "Last Fair Deal Gone Down", from Crossroad Blues
Dana Cameron, "Femme Sole", from Boston Noir
Dennis Lehane, "Animal Rescue", from Boston Noir
Luis Alberto Urrea, "Amapola", from Phoenix Noir

Critical / Non-fiction award
Winner:
P. D. James, Talking About Detective Fiction

Shortlist:
Otto Penzler, The Line Up: The World's Greatest Crime Writers Tell the Inside Story of Their Greatest Detectives
Lisa Rogak, Haunted Heart: The Life and Times of Stephen King
Elena Santangelo, Dame Agatha's Shorts: An Agatha Christie Short Story Companion
Joan Schenkar, The Talented Miss Highsmith: The Secret Life and Serious Art of Patricia Highsmith

References

External links

Anthony Awards
41
2010 in California
Culture of San Francisco
San Francisco Bay Area literature